is a retired female badminton player of Japan, who specialized in doubles.

Career
In 1977 she won both the All-England Championships and IBF World Championships in women's doubles with Etsuko Toganoo. In 1978 she was a member of Japan's world champion Uber Cup (women's international) team. She was also the gold medalist in 1979 World Cup in Women's doubles with partner Yoshiko Yonekura.

References
https://web.archive.org/web/20110520022601/http://www17.ocn.ne.jp/~sakurasc/newpage5.html 

1957 births
Living people
People from Neyagawa, Osaka
Japanese female badminton players
Asian Games medalists in badminton
Badminton players at the 1978 Asian Games
Medalists at the 1978 Asian Games
Asian Games bronze medalists for Japan